Ganghwa hyanggyo is in charge of Confucian education for its surrounding area. It is located on Ganghwa island.  Ganghwa hyanggyo was established in Gocheon-ri in 1127 (Injong 5), and was relocated several times to the present location in 1731 (youngjoe 7). The functions of the organization are: memorial services for ancestors in hyanggyo and the study of Confucianism.

References 

Goryeo
Confucian education
Religion in Korea